Daxing Airport Express, also spelled as Tahsing Airport Express of the Beijing Subway is an airport rail link from  (located at the Southern 3rd Ring Road) to the Beijing Daxing International Airport. It is colored blue on subway maps. The line opened on September 26, 2019.

It is one of two lines connecting the urban area of Beijing to the Beijing Daxing International Airport. The other line is the Beijing–Xiong'an intercity railway, a high-speed rail operated by China Railway.

The line is the second Beijing Subway line to be fully automated and driverless, after the Yanfang line.

Description

Phase 1
All stations are underground.

Phase 2 (Northern extension)
A  northern extension to Lize Business District station is currently under construction. The extension is fully underground. The northern extension started construction in 2020 and will be completed in 2023.

Fare
Ordinary Class one-way fare is ¥10, ¥25 or ¥35 (see below) and Business Class one-way fare is ¥50.

Rolling stock 
The train sets of Daxing Airport Express are built by CRRC Qingdao Sifang.

8 Car Train

 Car 7 is a business class car.
 Car 3 has a wheelchair space.
 Car 8 is a baggage car.

4 Car Train

 Car 4 is a business class car.
 Car 3 has a wheelchair space.

Stations

History
The Daxing Airport Express was originally planned to start from Mudanyuan, and be routed in parallel with Line 19 from Mudanyuan to Caoqiao. However, the plan would cost more than 40 billion yuan, which was considered too expensive for a dedicated line that would only serve passengers going to and from the airport. The parallel section with Line 19 was abandoned and the route was shortened to the stretch from Caoqiao to Daxing Airport. The investment required for the line was reduced by 20 billion yuan.

In 2014, it was reported that the government was going to invest 19.7 billion yuan in the Daxing Airport Express and a plan with 4 stations: Caoqiao, Daxing Xincheng, and two stations at the Daxing Airport.

In early 2016, it was announced that the Daxing Airport Express was slated for completion by 2019. Phase I of the line includes only 3 stations: Caoqiao, Daxing Xincheng and Daxing Airport. The line will operate at a top speed of  using Type D rolling stock, which is fully automated. Construction started at the end of 2016.

Test runs on the line began in June 2019, and the line was opened on September 26, 2019 (Phase 1).

Future expansion

North
The northern extension started construction in 2020 and will be completed in 2023.

South

Line R1 of Xiong'an Rail Transit
Line R1 of Xiong'an Rail Transit will through-operate with Daxing Airport Express. The section from Daxing Airport to Xiong'an Terminal is under construction.

Stations

Notes

References

Beijing Subway lines
Airport rail links in China
Railway lines opened in 2019
2019 establishments in China
25 kV AC railway electrification